IQ domain-containing protein E is a protein that in humans is encoded by the IQCE gene.

References

Further reading